The Mersey and Irwell Navigation was a river navigation in North West England, which provided a navigable route from the Mersey estuary to Salford and Manchester, by improving the course of the River Irwell and the River Mersey. Eight locks were constructed between 1724 and 1734, and the rivers were improved by the construction of new cuts several times subsequently. Use of the navigation declined from the 1870s, and it was ultimately superseded by the Manchester Ship Canal, the construction of which destroyed most of the Irwell section of the navigation and the long cut between Latchford and Runcorn.

History

The idea that the Rivers Mersey and Irwell should be made navigable from the Mersey Estuary in the west to Manchester in the east was first proposed in 1660, and revived in 1712 by Thomas Steers.  In 1720 the necessary bills were tabled.  The Act of Parliament for the navigation was received in 1721. The construction work was undertaken by the Mersey & Irwell Navigation Company. Work began in 1724, and by 1734 boats "of moderate size" could make the journey from quays in Water Street, Manchester,  to the Irish Sea.  The navigation was suitable only for small ships, and during periods of drought, or when strong easterly winds held back the tide in the estuary, there was not always sufficient draft for a fully laden boat.

Eight weirs were constructed along the length of the route, and some shortcuts were made around shallower parts of the river, with locks, to enable the passage of boats.  Some difficult turns along the river were also removed.

The navigation was modified and improved on a number of occasions.  A canal section known as the Runcorn and Latchford Canal was added in 1804, to bypass part of the lower reaches.  In 1740 the company built quays and warehouses along Water Street in Manchester.

In 1779 a group of businessmen from Manchester and Liverpool purchased the navigation, and began making improvements.  A difficult section below Howley lock was cut out by the building of the Runcorn to Latchford Canal, and at Runcorn a basin was built for boats to wait for the tide.

An aqueduct was built from Woolston Cut, to replace water lost from the locks that were used to raise boats into the new canal section.

The completion of the Bridgewater Canal in 1776, followed in 1830 by the opening of the Liverpool & Manchester Railway, meant increasing competition for the carriage of goods, and in 1844 the navigation was purchased on behalf of the Bridgewater Canal Company, for £550,800.  In 1846 ownership was transferred to the canal company.

The company in charge of the navigation was known by several names.  These include "The Old Navigation", "Old Quay Company", and "Old Quay Canal".

Decline
In 1872, the navigation was sold to the newly formed Bridgewater Navigation Company for £1,112,000, but it had by then fallen into disrepair.  In 1882 it was described as being "hopelessly choked with silt and filth", and was open to 50-ton boats for only 47 out of 311 working days.

Economic conditions deteriorated during the mid-1870s, in what has been called the Long Depression. A ship canal was proposed as a way to reverse Manchester's economic decline by giving the city direct access to the sea for its imports and exports of manufactured goods.

Closure
The construction of the Manchester Ship Canal obliterated large parts of the earlier navigation, including almost the whole of the Irwell part of the course (except for a short length upstream of Pomona Docks, which is the only surviving part of the navigation today).

A short way downstream of the confluence with the Mersey, the ship canal followed a more southerly course than the old navigation, which remained in use as late as 1950 from Rixton Junction downstream.

The lower reaches of the ship canal from Eastham to Latchford obliterated a large section of the Runcorn to Latchford Canal, leaving just a short stub joining the navigation to the canal near Stockton Heath.  The Woolston New Cut, excavated in 1821, is still visible although completely dry.  Woolston Old Cut, built in 1755, still exists although the lock is gone.

Design and construction

Locks
There were originally eight locks along the navigation.  Each lock chamber was 13 feet wide by 65 feet long.

Throstles Nest Lock was the highest on the navigation.  It was followed by Mode Wheel lock.  Lock 3 was at Barton-upon-Irwell, next to James Brindley's original Barton Aqueduct.  The remains of the lock island appear to be situated in the same location as the island presently used for the swing aqueduct.  Stickins Lock followed, in a  cut.  There were further locks named Holmes Bridge, Calamanco, Holmes Bridge and finally Howley Tidal.

Further locks were added throughout the route's history.  These include a new Stickins Lock, Sandywarps Lock in a cut located close to the confluence of the Irwell and Mersey, Butchersfield Locks (located on a short cut known as the Butchersfield Canal), Woolston New (located at the upper end of Woolston New Cut), Paddington Lock (lower end of Woolston New Cut), Woolston Old Lock, Latchford, and Old Quay Sea Locks.

See also

Canals of the United Kingdom
History of the British canal system

References
Notes

Citations

Bibliography

Rivers of Greater Manchester
Rivers of the Metropolitan Borough of Bury
Rivers of Manchester
Rivers of Salford
River navigations in the United Kingdom
Former or disused inland waterways
Canals in Greater Manchester
Canals in Manchester
Rivers of Cheshire
Canals in Cheshire
Canals opened in 1734